Drug tolerance or drug insensitivity is a pharmacological concept describing subjects' reduced reaction to a drug following its repeated use. Increasing its dosage may re-amplify the drug's effects; however, this may accelerate tolerance, further reducing the drug's effects. Drug tolerance is indicative of drug use but is not necessarily associated with drug dependence or addiction. The process of tolerance development is reversible (e.g., through a drug holiday) and can involve both physiological factors and psychological factors.

One may also develop drug tolerance to side effects, in which case tolerance is a desirable characteristic. A medical intervention that has an objective to increase tolerance (e.g., allergen immunotherapy, in which one is exposed to larger and larger amounts of allergen to decrease one's allergic reactions) is called drug desensitization.

The opposite concept to drug tolerance is drug reverse tolerance (or drug sensitization), in which case the subject's reaction or effect will increase following its repeated use. The two notions are not incompatible and tolerance may sometimes lead to reverse tolerance. For example, heavy drinkers initially develop tolerance to alcohol (requiring them to drink larger amounts to achieve a similar effect) but excessive drinking can cause liver damage, which then puts them at risk of intoxication when drinking even very small amounts of alcohol.

Drug tolerance should not be confused with drug tolerability, which refers to the degree to which overt adverse effects of a drug can be tolerated by a patient.

Tachyphylaxis

Tachyphylaxis is a subcategory of drug tolerance referring to cases of sudden, short-term onset of tolerance following the administration of a drug.

Pharmacodynamic tolerance

Pharmacodynamic tolerance begins when the cellular response to a substance is reduced with repeated use. A common cause of pharmacodynamic tolerance is high concentrations of a substance constantly binding with the receptor, desensitizing it through constant interaction. Other possibilities include a reduction in receptor density (usually associated with receptor agonists), or other mechanisms leading to changes in action potential firing rate. Pharmacodynamic tolerance to a receptor antagonist involves the reverse, i.e., increased receptor firing rate, an increase in receptor density, or other mechanisms.

While most occurrences of pharmacodynamic tolerance occur after sustained exposure to a drug, instances of acute or instant tolerance (tachyphylaxis) can occur.

Pharmacokinetic (metabolic) tolerance

Pharmacokinetics refers to the absorption, distribution, metabolism, and excretion of drugs (ADME). All psychoactive drugs are first absorbed into the bloodstream, carried in the blood to various parts of the body including the site of action (distribution), broken down in some fashion (metabolism), and ultimately removed from the body (excretion). All of these factors are very important determinants of crucial pharmacological properties of a drug, including its potency, side effects, and duration of action.

Pharmacokinetic tolerance (dispositional tolerance) occurs because of a decreased quantity of the substance reaching the site it affects. This may be caused by an increase in induction of the enzymes required for degradation of the drug e.g. CYP450 enzymes. This is most commonly seen with substances such as ethanol.

This type of tolerance is most evident with oral ingestion, because other routes of drug administration bypass first-pass metabolism. Enzyme induction is partly responsible for the phenomenon of tolerance, in which repeated use of a drug leads to a reduction of the drug's effect. However, it is only one of several mechanisms leading to tolerance.

Behavioral tolerance
Behavioral tolerance occurs with the use of certain psychoactive drugs, where tolerance to a behavioral effect of a drug, such as increased motor activity by methamphetamine, occurs with repeated use. It may occur through drug-independent learning or as a form of pharmacodynamic tolerance in the brain; the former mechanism of behavioral tolerance occurs when one learns how to actively overcome drug-induced impairment through practice. Behavioral tolerance is often context-dependent, meaning tolerance depends on the environment in which the drug is administered, and not on the drug itself. Behavioral sensitization describes the opposite phenomenon.

See also

References 

Addiction
Pharmacodynamics
Substance dependence